Shirinov is a masculine surname of Azerbaijani origin, its feminine counterpart is Shirinova. Notable people with the surname include:

Natig Shirinov (born 1975), Azerbaijani percussionist 
Vagif Shirinov (born 1969), Russian football player

Russian-language surnames